The Continental Cup 2007–08 was the 11th edition of the IIHF Continental Cup. The season started on September 14, 2007, and finished on January 6, 2008.

The tournament was won by Ak Bars Kazan, who led the final group.

The points system used in this tournament was: the winner in regular time won 3 points, the loser 0 points; in case of a tie, an overtime and a penalty shootout is played, the winner in penalty shootouts or overtime won 2 points and the loser won 1 point.

Preliminary round

Group A
(Miercurea Ciuc, Romania)

Group A standings

First Group Stage

Group B
(Aalborg, Denmark)

Group B standings

Group C
(Tilburg, Netherlands)

Group C standings

Group D
(Nowy Targ, Poland)

Group D standings

 Brûleurs de Loups Grenoble     :  bye

Second Group Stage

Group E
(Grenoble, France)

Group E standings

 HK Riga 2000,
 Ak Bars Kazan     :  bye

Final stage

Final Group
(Riga, Latvia)

Final Group standings

References
 Continental Cup 2008

2007–08 in European ice hockey
IIHF Continental Cup
2008
Latvian